A penumbral lunar eclipse took place on Tuesday, December 20, 1983, the second of two lunar eclipses in 1983. At the maximum eclipse, 89% of the Moon's disk was partially shaded by the Earth, which caused a slight shadow gradient across its disc; this subtle effect may have been visible to careful observers. No part of the Moon was in complete shadow. The eclipse lasted 4 hours and 2 minutes overall.

Visibility

Related lunar eclipses

Eclipses in 1983 
 A total solar eclipse at the Moon's ascending node of the orbit on Saturday, June 11th, 1983.
 A partial lunar eclipse at the Moon's descending node of the orbit on Saturday, June 25th, 1983.
 An annular solar eclipse at the Moon's descending node of the orbit on Sunday, December 04th, 1983.
 A penumbral lunar eclipse at the Moon's ascending node of the orbit on Tuesday, December 20th, 1983.

Lunar year series

Saros cycle 
Lunar Saros series 144, repeating every 18 years and 11 days, has a total of 71 lunar eclipse events including 20 total lunar eclipses.

First Penumbral Lunar Eclipse: 1749 Jul 29

First Partial Lunar Eclipse: 2146 Mar 28

First Total Lunar Eclipse: 2308 Jul 04

First Central Lunar Eclipse: 2362 Aug 06

Greatest Eclipse of the Lunar Saros 144: 2416 Sep 07

Last Central Lunar Eclipse: 2488 Oct 20

Last Total Lunar Eclipse: 2651 Jan 28

Last Partial Lunar Eclipse: 2867 Jun 08

Last Penumbral Lunar Eclipse: 3011 Sep 04

Half-Saros cycle
A lunar eclipse will be preceded and followed by solar eclipses by 9 years and 5.5 days (a half saros). This lunar eclipse is related to two partial solar eclipses of Solar Saros 151.

Tzolkinex 
 Preceded: Lunar eclipse of November 6, 1976

 Followed: Lunar eclipse of March 13, 1998

See also 
List of lunar eclipses
List of 20th-century lunar eclipses

Notes

External links 
 

1983-12
1983 in science
December 1983 events